Pregara is a village in the City Municipality of Koper in the Littoral region of Slovenia on the border with Croatia.

History
In 1954, when the Free Territory of Trieste was dissolved and Zone B was assigned to Yugoslavia, Pregara (together with Abitanti, Belvedur, Brezovica pri Gradinu, Gradin, Koromači–Boškini, Močunigi, and Sirči) was originally assigned to the Socialist Republic of Croatia. In 1956 these villages were reassigned to the Socialist Republic of Slovenia.

Church
The parish church in the settlement is dedicated to Our Lady of Mount Carmel. A chapel outside the settlement, next to the cemetery, is dedicated to Saint Simon.

References

External links
Pregara on Geopedia

Populated places in the City Municipality of Koper